Wendi Nix (born September 17, 1974) is an American anchor and sports reporter for ESPN.

Professional
Nix is the former co-host of ESPN's number one program, NFL Live. Nix primarily handles coverage for NFL and college football games featuring teams from the New England area. Prior to working for ESPN, Nix was a weekend sports anchor at WHDH in Boston (2003–2006) and previously reported for Fox Sports Net, NESN and WPDE in South Carolina. Nix remains an occasional guest analyst on the weekend show Sports Extra on WHDH.

Personal
Nix was born in Murrells Inlet, South Carolina. She is a 1992 graduate of Socastee High School, where she was a cheerleader, a three-time homecoming queen, and a member of the track team. She has received degrees from Union County College in Cranford, New Jersey, the University of Massachusetts Amherst, and Wofford College in Spartanburg, South Carolina. At Wofford, Nix was president of the student body and captain of the golf team; she is a proud fan and supporter of the Terriers. She babysat future Las Vegas Raiders wide receiver Hunter Renfrow.
 
Nix's marriage to Pittsburgh Pirates general manager Ben Cherington, whom she met at UMass, ended in 2010; they share two daughters. She has been married to Joseph Ritchie since December 10, 2011.

References

External links
ESPN MediaZone Bio
 

Major League Baseball broadcasters
National Football League announcers
College football announcers
ESPN people
University of Massachusetts Amherst alumni
Wofford College alumni
Television anchors from Boston
Sports in Boston
1974 births
Living people
People from Murrells Inlet, South Carolina
Women sports announcers